Apocera costata is a species of snout moth in the genus Apocera. It was described by William Schaus in 1912. It is found in Costa Rica.

References

Moths described in 1912
Epipaschiinae
Moths of Central America